Across the Meridian is the eighth studio album by British band Pram. It was released in July 2018 by Domino Records. It is their first album in eleven years since The Moving Frontier (2007)

Release
On 14 June 2018 Pram announced the release of the album, along with the first single "Shimmer and Disappear".

Track listing

Core Personnel 
Matt Eaton - guitar, bass guitar, sampler, keyboards, percussion
Sam Owen –  bass guitar, guitar, keyboards, accordion, woodwind, percussion, vocals
Max Simpson – keyboards, sampler, melodica
Harry Dawes – trumpet, trombone, keyboards, theremin

References

2018 albums
Pram (band) albums
Domino Recording Company albums